The Johns Hopkins Carey Business School (also Carey Business School or simply Carey) is the graduate business school of Johns Hopkins University, a private research university in Baltimore, Maryland. It was established in 2007 and offers full-time and part-time programs leading to the Master of Business Administration (MBA) and Master of Science (MS) degrees.

The business school is named after James Carey (1751-1834), a relative of Johns Hopkins. In 2006, sixth-generation descendant William P. Carey, through the W. P. Carey Foundation, donated $50 million to the Johns Hopkins University, contributing to the establishment of Carey Business School.

History
In 2007, the School of Professional Studies in Business and Education at Johns Hopkins University was split into two new schools—Carey Business School and the School of Education. As one of nine schools within Johns Hopkins, the School of Professional Studies had featured the majority of the university's part-time academic programs to serve the educational needs of working professionals.

The establishment of Carey Business School was engendered by the announcement in 2006 of a $50 million gift by philanthropist William P. Carey to Johns Hopkins through his W. P. Carey Foundation, in order to create a business school at the university. To date, this is the largest gift ever made to Johns Hopkins University in support of business education. The school is named after William P. Carey's ancestor, James Carey (1751-1834), a Baltimore shipper in the 18th and 19th centuries, chairman of the Bank of Maryland, a member of the Baltimore City Council, and a relative of university founder Johns Hopkins. W. P. Carey Foundation has similarly contributed to the endowments of the W. P. Carey School of Business at the Arizona State University ($50 million pledge in 2003), the University of Maryland Francis King Carey School of Law ($30 million donation in 2011), and the University of Pennsylvania Carey Law School ($125 million gift in 2019).

Yash Gupta served as the inaugural dean of Carey Business School from 2008 to 2011. In 2010, after the recession ended, Carey Business School launched its full-time Global MBA program. In 2011, Carey Business School relocated to the Legg Mason Tower in Inner Harbor East, Baltimore. The business school was originally located on Charles Street.

Carey Business School previously offered an undergraduate program. In 2008, Carey phased out undergraduate freshman and sophomore courses and began offering only two upper-division (junior and senior years only) undergraduate programs, a Bachelor of Science in Business and Management and a Bachelor of Science in Information Systems. Carey primarily targeted non-traditional and transfer undergraduate students. The Bachelor of Business Administration (BBA) program enrolled its last incoming class in fall 2016.

Bernard T. Ferrari served as dean from 2012 to 2019. In 2015, Carey began to offer online classes to serve working professionals and students based in other geographic regions. In 2017, Carey Business School earned accreditation from the Association to Advance Collegiate Schools of Business (AACSB).

In 2019, Alexander Triantis was appointed as the third and current dean of Carey Business School. In 2019, Carey Business School redesigned its full-time Master of Business Administration (MBA) program, succeeding the previous flagship Global MBA program which operated from 2010 to 2019. The redesigned curriculum provides students with more intense experiential learning opportunities and includes courses focusing on artificial intelligence, health care, data analytics, technology, and innovation.

Academics

The Johns Hopkins Carey Business School is accredited by the Association to Advance Collegiate Schools of Business (AACSB) and Middle States Commission on Higher Education (MSCHE).

Carey Business School launched its full-time Master of Business Administration (MBA) program in 2010. In 2019, Carey Business School redesigned its full-time MBA program, replacing the previous flagship Global MBA program which operated from 2010 to 2019. The revamped curriculum increases experiential learning opportunities for students and includes courses focusing on health care, data analysis, technology, and innovation.

Key components of the program include the Big Data Consulting Project where students partner with leading companies to gain practical experience in analyzing a data set related to a business challenge. The Innovation Field Project places students on-site with partner organizations across different industries and sectors throughout the country. MBA students can also specialize in Health, Technology, and Innovation specialization, which capitalizes on Johns Hopkins world-renowned leadership in medicine, nursing, public health, and advanced biotechnology.

Carey Business School offers a part-time Flexible MBA program, which may be completed by mostly online classes. The Flexible MBA program consists of 54 credits, of which 20 are required Business Foundation courses, and now offers eight curricular specializations. Carey began offering online classes since 2015 to serve working professionals and students based in other geographic regions.

Aside from MBA programs, Carey Business School offers Master of Science (MS) degree programs in several business specializations in full-time and part-time formats. MS students, upon completing their degrees at Carey Business School, also have the option of earning an MBA by completing additional courses.

Master of Science in Finance
Master of Science in Marketing
Master of Science in Health Care Management
Master of Science in Information Systems
Master of Science in Business Analytics and Risk Management
Master of Science in Real Estate and Infrastructure

Locations

Carey Business School has two campus locations in the Baltimore–Washington metropolitan area, including:
 The flagship Baltimore campus, located in Legg Mason Tower in the Inner Harbor East neighborhood
 Washington, D.C. campus on Embassy Row, located in Dupont Circle area,  near the Johns Hopkins Paul H. Nitze School of Advanced International Studies (SAIS)
In fall 2022, Carey Business School announced that it will move its Washington campus to a new location, 555 Pennsylvania Avenue, NW, starting fall 2023. The new space is designed to facilitate interaction and collaboration among faculty, staff, and students and allow the business school to better provide academic programs and emerging learning modalities.

Rankings

The Johns Hopkins University is highly ranked as a research university in national and global rankings. However, in recent years, Carey Business School has not participated in major business school rankings like those published by U.S. News & World Report, Financial Times, Bloomberg Businessweek, and The Economist.

In 2019, Carey Business School's MS in Marketing was ranked No. 20 as part of the QS World University Rankings.

Publications
The business school publishes Carey Business magazine targeting its alumni, students, faculty, and staff. In April 2014, Carey launched Changing Business, a biannual magazine highlighting faculty research.

Notable people

Faculty
 Maqbool Dada - Professor of Operations Management
 Tinglong Dai - Professor of Operations Management and Business Analytics
 Paul J. Ferraro - Bloomberg Distinguished Professor of Business and Engineering
 Matthew Kahn - Former Bloomberg Distinguished Professor of Economics and Business
Sunil Kumar - Professor of Operations Management and Business Analytics; Provost and Senior Vice President for Academic Affairs at Johns Hopkins University
Marty Makary - Mark Ravitch Chair in Gastrointestinal Surgery at Johns Hopkins School of Medicine; Professor of Surgery and Public Health at the Johns Hopkins Bloomberg School of Public Health; Professor at Carey Business School
 Phillip Phan - Alonzo and Virginia Decker Professor of Strategy and Entrepreneurship
Daniel Polsky - Bloomberg Distinguished Professor of Health Policy and Economics
 Kathleen M. Sutcliffe - Bloomberg Distinguished Professor of Business and Medicine

Leadership
 Alexander Triantis - Current dean since 2019, former dean of Robert H. Smith School of Business at the University of Maryland, College Park (2013-2019).
 Bernard T. Ferrari - Dean from 2012 until 2019
 Yash Gupta - Dean from 2008 until 2011, former dean of USC Marshall School of Business (2004-2006) and University of Washington Foster School of Business (1999-2004), and University of Colorado Denver Business School (1992-1999).

Alumni

 Obafemi Ayanbadejo (MBA '13) - former American football fullback 
 Ken Babby (MBA) -  Owner, Akron RubberDucks and Jacksonville Jumbo Shrimp 
 Matthew E. Bershadker (MBA) - President and CEO, American Society for the Prevention of Cruelty to Animals
 Candy Carson (MAS) - Violinist; wife of Ben Carson 
 Segun Toyin Dawodu (MBA '09) – Physician, entrepreneur, journalist and attorney; founder of Dawodu.com
 William J. Frank (MAS '92) member of Maryland House of Delegates
 Douglas Jabs (MBA '98) - CEO of the Mount Sinai Faculty Practice Associates, Dean for Clinical Affairs; Professor and Chair of the Department of Ophthalmology and Professor of Medicine of The Mount Sinai School of Medicine in New York City
 Alvin B. Jackson (MBA) -  former member of Utah State Senate
 J.D. Kleinke (MBA) - American entrepreneur, writer, and thought leader in the health care industry
 Andrea Leand (MBA '02) - professional tennis player
 George David Low (MBA)- American aerospace executive and a NASA astronaut
 Patrick Maggitti, PhD (MBA '02), first Provost of Villanova University, former Dean of the Villanova School of Business
Alexandra Miller (MBA '09) - Republican politician and businesswoman
 John Morlu - former Auditor-General of Republic of Liberia
 Morgan Ortagus (MBA '13) - Spokesperson for the U.S. Department of State
 Karen Peetz (MS ’81) - former President, BNY Mellon; No.1 "Most Powerful Women in Banking"
 Griffin P. Rodgers (MBA '05) -  Director of National Institute of Diabetes and Digestive and Kidney Diseases; Chief of NIH's Molecular and Clinical Hematology Branch; known for contributions to research and therapy for sickle cell anemia
 Leslie Sanchez (MBA) - Author of Los Republicanos: Why Hispanics and Republicans Need Each Other; 100 Most Influential Hispanic Americans
 Laurence Shanet (ASC in Marketing Communications) - Film director
 Peter Staats (MBA '04) -  American physician, educator, author, inventor and clinical researcher, specializing in interventional pain medicine; founder of the Division of Pain Medicine at the Johns Hopkins School of Medicine

See also
 Johns Hopkins University
 List of business schools in the United States
 List of Johns Hopkins University people in business
 Business School

References

External links
 Official website

Johns Hopkins University
Business schools in Maryland
Educational institutions established in 1909
1909 establishments in Maryland